Hollins Lane is a village near the village of Forton, in the Wyre District, in the English county of Lancashire. The village has the Lancaster and Preston Junction Railway running through it but there is no station.

Amenities 
Hollins Lane has a place of worship, a post office and a pub, the New Holly.

Nearby settlements 
Nearby settlements include the town of Garstang, the village of Forton and the hamlet of Shireshead.

Location grid

Transport 
For transport there is the M6 motorway and the A6 road nearby.

References 

 http://www.newholly.co.uk

Villages in Lancashire
Geography of the Borough of Wyre